Lyctus is a genus of powder-post beetles in the family Bostrichidae, being present on all continents except Antarctica.

Species
These species belong to the genus Lyctus:

 Lyctus africanus Lesne, 1907 i c g b (African powderpost beetle)
 Lyctus argentinensis Santoro, 1960 i c g
 Lyctus asiaticus Iablokoff-Khnzorian, 1976 i c g
 Lyctus brunneus (Stephens, 1830) i c g b (brown powderpost beetle)
 Lyctus carbonarius Waltl, 1832 i c g b (southern lyctus beetle, = Lyctus planicollis)
 Lyctus caribeanus Lesne, 1931 i c g b
 Lyctus cavicollis LeCOnte, 1866 i c g b (shiny powderpost beetle)
 Lyctus chacoensis Santoro, 1960 i c g
 Lyctus chilensis Gerberg, 1957 i c g
 Lyctus cinereus Blanchard, 1851 i c g
 Lyctus discedens Blackburn, 1888 i c g
 Lyctus hipposideros Lesne, 1908 i c g
 Lyctus histeroides Fabricius, 1792 g
 Lyctus kosciuszkoi Borowski and Wegrzynowicz, 2007 c g
 Lyctus linearis (Goeze, 1777) i c g b (European powderpost beetle)
 Lyctus longicornis Reitter, 1879 i c g
 Lyctus opaculus LeConte, 1866 i c g b
 Lyctus parallelocollis Blackburn, 1888 i c g
 Lyctus parvulus Casey, 1885 i g
 Lyctus patagonicus Santoro, 1960 i c g
 Lyctus pubescens Panzer, 1793 i c g
 Lyctus simplex Reitter, 1879 i c g
 Lyctus sinensis Lesne, 1911 i c g
 Lyctus suturalis Faldermann, 1837 i c g
 Lyctus tomentosus Reitter, 1879 i c g
 Lyctus turkestanicus Lesne, 1935 i c g
 Lyctus villosus Lesne, 1911 i c g b

Data sources: i = ITIS, c = Catalogue of Life, g = GBIF, b = Bugguide.net

References

External links

Lyctus at Fauna Europaea

Bostrichidae